Gregory Asbestas was an influential bishop from Syracuse, who served thrice as Archbishop of Syracuse (844 – ca. 852/3, 858–867, and 877–878/9) and later (879–880) as metropolitan bishop of Nicaea. A protégé of the Patriarch of Constantinople Methodius I, he played an important role in the church conflicts of the day, becoming one of the leading opponents of Methodius' rival and successor, Ignatius, who dethroned him. Asbestas consequently became a close ally of another opponent of Ignatius, Photius, and when Ignatius was deposed and succeeded by Photius in 858, Asbestas was reinstated and performed Photius' consecration. He was deposed again during Ignatius' second patriarchate (858–867). He wrote a Life of Methodius, and reportedly authored caricatures ridiculing Ignatius, but neither of these works survives.

Sources 

9th-century Byzantine bishops
9th-century archbishops
Byzantine Sicily
People from Syracuse, Sicily
Bishops of Nicaea